Bill Anderson Sings is a studio album by American country singer-songwriter Bill Anderson. It was released in February 1964 on Decca Records and was produced by Owen Bradley. The album was Anderson's second studio release as a recording artist and included two singles that became major hits on the Billboard country chart. The album itself would also reach positions on the Billboard charts following its release.

Background and content
Bill Anderson Sings was recorded between 1960 and 1963 at both the Bradley Studio and the Columbia Recording Studio. Both studios were located in Nashville, Tennessee and all sessions were produced by Owen Bradley. Anderson and Bradley also collaborated for his previous studio album, among other recordings. The album consisted of 12 tracks. Five of the record's songs were written or co-written by Anderson. Some recordings were remakes of originals recorded by other artists. The second track, "Abilene", was first recorded by George Hamilton IV. The third track, "I'm Leaving It Up to You", was originally cut by the duo Dale & Grace. Additionally, the seventh track, "500 Miles Away from Home", was recorded at the time by Bobby Bare.

Release and chart performance
Bill Anderson Sings was officially released in February 1964 and was his second studio album for the Decca label. It was issued as a vinyl record, containing six songs on each side of the record. Upon its release, the album peaked at number 7 in April 1964 on the Billboard Top Country Albums chart. It became Anderson's second album to place on this chart. Bill Anderson Sings also included two singles that were released in 1963. The first single, "8x10", was released in August 1963 and peaked at number 2 on the Billboard Hot Country Singles chart. The single also became Anderson's third single to place on the Billboard Hot 100, peaking at number 53 in September. Also that September, the single reached number 18 on the adult contemporary chart. The second single issued was "Five Little Fingers" was released in December 1963. The song also became a major hit, reaching number 5 on the country chart in February 1964. Additionally, the single's B-side charted on the same Billboard country chart, peaking at number 15 in May 1964.

Track listing

Personnel
All credits are adapted from the liner notes of Bill Anderson Sings.

Musical personnel

 Bill Anderson – lead vocals
 Brenton Banks – strings
 Harold Bradley – guitar
 George Brinkley – strings
 Cecil Brower – strings
 Howard Carpenter – strings
 Floyd Cramer – piano
 Pete Drake – steel guitar
 Ray Edenton – guitar
 Sofie Fott – strings
 Hank Garland – guitar
 Michael Gattozzi – strings
 Buddy Harman – drums

 Lillian Hunt – strings
 Bob Johnson – banjo
 The Jordanaires – background vocals
 Jerry Kennedy – guitar
 The Anita Kerr Singers – background vocals
 Douglas Kirkham – drums
 Grady Martin – guitar
 Bill McElhiney – trumpet
 Bob Moore – bass
 Hargus "Pig" Robbins – piano
 Joe Zinkan – bass

Technical personnel
 Owen Bradley – record producer

Chart performance

Release history

References

1964 albums
Albums produced by Owen Bradley
Bill Anderson (singer) albums
Decca Records albums